Iran–Pakistan relations covers the bilateral relations between the adjacent states of Iran and Pakistan. After Pakistan gained its independence in August 1947, Iran was one of the first countries to recognize its sovereign status. Relations between Shi'a-majority Iran and Sunni-majority Pakistan became greatly strained due to sectarian tensions in the 1980s, as Pakistani Shi'a Muslims claimed that they were being discriminated against under the Sunni-biased Islamization program being imposed throughout Pakistan by the military dictatorship government of then-President, General Muhammad Zia-ul-Haq. Following the 1979 Islamic Revolution, Iran and Saudi Arabia (considered the "leading state authority" of Shi'a and Sunni Muslims, respectively) gradually began to use Pakistan as a battleground for their proxy sectarian conflict, and Pakistan's support for the Deobandi Taliban organization in Afghanistan during the civil wars in the 1990s became a problem for Shi'a Iran, which opposed a Taliban-controlled Afghanistan.

Nevertheless, both countries continue to cooperate economically where possible and are forming alliances in a number of areas of mutual interest, such as fighting the drug trade along their border and combating the insurgency in the Balochistan region. Iran has also expressed an interest in joining the China–Pakistan Economic Corridor (CPEC) as part of the larger Chinese Belt and Road Initiative.

Pakistan is one of the few countries where Iranian influence is positively received as per polls conducted by the Pew Research Center. Polls have consistently shown that a very high proportion of Pakistanis view their western neighbour positively. Supreme Leader of Iran Ayatollah Khamenei has also called for the sympathy, assistance, and inter-cooperation of all Muslim nations, including Pakistan.

Diplomatic relations between the two states have recently improved under the policies of former Prime Minister of Pakistan Imran Khan, who sought to expand Pakistan's relationship with Iran. He has also offered to serve as a mediator between Saudi Arabia and Iran in their ongoing proxy conflict. However, some tensions have remained.

Antiquity 

The regions that comprise today's Iran and Pakistan have been under the rule of contiguous Eurasian polities at various points in history, as Pakistan straddles an intermediary zone between the Iranian Plateau and Indian subcontinent. The Persian Achaemenid Empire, which spanned (among other regions) the area between the Balkans and the area of the Indus River (known to the Persians as Hind) at its height, conquered the regions comprising modern-day Pakistani provinces of Balochistan and Khyber Pakhtunkhwa during the reign of Darius I.

Relations during the Cold War

Imperial Iran maintained close relations with Pakistan during the Cold War, partly owing to their mutual alliance with the United States-led Western Bloc. Iran was the first country to recognize Pakistan as an independent state, and Shah Mohammad Reza Pahlavi was the first head of any state to come on an official state visit to Pakistan (in March 1950). Since 1947, Muhammad Ali Jinnah, the founder of Pakistan, had successfully advocated a policy of fostering cordial relations with the Muslim world and Iran in particular.

In May 1950, a treaty of friendship was signed by Prime Minister Liaquat Ali Khan and Mohammad Reza Pahlavi. Some of the clauses of the treaty of friendship had wider geopolitical significance. Pakistan found a natural partner in Iran after the Indian government chose to support Egyptian President Gamal Abdel Nasser, who was seeking to export a pan-Arab ideology that threatened many of the more traditional Arab monarchies, a number of which were allied with the Shah of Iran. Harsh V. Pant, a foreign policy writer, noted that Iran was a natural ally and model for Pakistan for other reasons as well. Both countries granted each other MFN status for trade purposes; the Shah offered Iranian oil and gas to Pakistan on generous terms, and the Iranian and Pakistani militaries extensively cooperated to suppress the rebel movement in Baluchistan. During the Shah's era, Iran moved closer to Pakistan in many fields. Pakistan, Iran, and Turkey joined the United States-sponsored Central Treaty Organization, which extended a defensive alliance along with the Soviet Union's southern perimeter. Iran played an important role in the Indo-Pakistani War of 1965, providing Pakistan with nurses, medical supplies, and a gift of 5,000 tons of petroleum. Iran also indicated that it was considering an embargo on oil supplies to India for the duration of the armed conflict. The Indian government firmly believed that Iran had blatantly favoured Pakistan and sought to undermine India during the war. After the suspension of American military aid to Pakistan, Iran was reported to have purchased ninety F-86 Sabrejet fighter planes from West Germany, and subsequently delivered them to Pakistan.

Although Pakistan's decision to join the Central Treaty Organization (CENTO) in 1955 was largely motivated by its security imperatives regarding India, Pakistan did not sign on until Iran was satisfied that the British government was not going to obstruct the nationalization of British oil companies in Iran. According to Dr Mujtaba Razvi, Pakistan likely would not have joined CENTO had Iran been negatively affected during these events.

Iran again played a vital role for Pakistan in the Indo-Pakistani War of 1971, this time supplying military equipment as well as diplomatic support against India. The Shah described the Indian attack as blatant aggression and interference in Pakistan's domestic/internal affairs; in an interview with a Parisian newspaper he openly acknowledged that "We are one hundred percent behind Pakistan". Iranian Prime Minister Amir-Abbas Hoveida followed suit, saying that "Pakistan has been subjected to violence and force." The Iranian leadership repeatedly expressed its opposition to the dismemberment of Pakistan, fearing it would adversely affect the domestic stability and security of Iran by encouraging Kurdish and Baloch separatists to rise up against the Iranian government. In the same vein, Iran attempted to justify its supplying of arms to Pakistan on the grounds that, in its desperation, Pakistan might fall into the lap of the Chinese (a communist rival to the U.S.-led Western Bloc).

The subsequent breakup of Pakistan in December 1971 convinced Iran that extraordinary effort was needed to protect the stability and territorial integrity of its eastern flank. With the emergence of Bangladesh as a separate state, the "Two-Nation Theory/Pakistan Movement" as well as the state of Pakistan itself had received a severe negative blow to its reputation and questions arose in the Iranian establishment as to whether the residual western part of Pakistan could hold together and remain a single country. Events of this period caused significant perceptional changes in Tehran regarding Pakistan.

When a widespread armed insurgency broke out in Pakistan's Balochistan province in 1973, Iran, fearing the Baloch insurgency might spill over into its own Sistan and Baluchistan Province, offered large-scale support. Iran provided Pakistan with military hardware (including thirty AH-1 Cobra attack helicopters), intelligence, and $200 million in aid. The government of then-Pakistani Prime Minister Zulfikar Ali Bhutto declared its belief that, as in the 1971 Bangladesh Liberation War, India was once again behind the unrest and uprising of rebels in the Balochistan region. However, the Indian government denied any involvement, and claimed that it was fearful of further balkanisation of the subcontinent. After three years of fighting the uprising was majorly suppressed.

In addition to military aid, the Shah of Iran offered considerable developmental aid to Pakistan, including oil and gas on preferential terms. Pakistan was a developing country and small power while Iran, in the 1960-70s, had the world's fifth-largest military, a strong economic/industrial base and was the clear, undisputed regional superpower. However, Iran's total dependence on the United States at that time for its economic development and military build-up had won it hostility from the more Soviet-aligned Arab world. Brief tensions between Iran and Pakistan arose in 1974, when Mohammad Reza Pahlavi refused to attend the Islamic Conference in Lahore because Libyan leader Muammar Gaddafi had been – despite the known hostility between two – invited to it by Pakistan. Later in 1976, Iran again played a vital and influential role by facilitating a rapprochement between Pakistan and Afghanistan.

Iran's reaction to India's surprise 1974 nuclear test detonation (codenamed Smiling Buddha) was muted. During a state visit to Iran in 1977, Pakistani PM Bhutto tried to persuade Pahlavi to support Pakistan's own clandestine atomic bomb project. Although the Shah's response is not officially known, there are indications that he refused to oblige Bhutto.

In July 1977, following political agitation by an opposition alliance, Bhutto was forced out of office in a military coup d'état. The new military dictatorship government, under General Muhammad Zia-ul-Haq, was ideologically ultraconservative and religiously oriented in its nature and approach in contrast to the more secular Iran at the time.

Relationship after the 1979 Iranian Revolution

The 1979 Iranian Revolution led progressive Iranian-Pakistani relations to deteriorate as opposed to prospering as they did during the reign of the Shah. Bhutto's ouster was followed a half year later by the Iranian Revolution and subsequent overthrow of the Shah of Iran. The Supreme Leader of the newly established Islamic Republic of Iran, Ruhollah Khomeini, withdrew the country from CENTO and violently ended its association with the United States. The religiously influenced military dictatorship of Zia-ul-Haq and the Islamic Revolution in Iran suited one another well enough, and as such there was no major diplomatic and political cleavage between them. In 1979, Pakistan was one of the first countries in the world to recognize the new revolutionary regime in Iran. Responding swiftly to this revolutionary change, Foreign Minister of Pakistan Agha Shahi immediately undertook a state visit to Tehran, meeting with his Iranian counterpart Karim Sanjabi on 10 March 1979. Both expressed confidence that Iran and Pakistan were going to march together to a brighter future. The next day, Agha Shahi held talks with the Ayatollah, Ruhollah Khomeini, in which developments in the region were discussed. On 11 April 1979, Pakistani President Zia-ul-Haq famously declared that "Khomeini is a symbol of Islamic insurgence". Reciprocating Zia-ul-Haq's sentiments, Khomeini, in a letter, called for Muslim unity. He declared: "Ties with Pakistan are based on Islam." Despite Shi'a-Sunni divisions (Iran being a Shi'a-majority state and Pakistan being a Sunni-majority state), the common desire for a pan-Islamic identity became an important factor in shaping new Iranian–Pakistani relations. By 1981, however, Zia-ul-Haq's Pakistan had once again formed close ties with the United States, a position it largely remained in for decades to come.

Iranian influence on Pakistan's Shi'a population
Iranian leaders had sought to extend their sphere of influence into Pakistan and to counter Saudi influence. As such, a pro-Iranian stance amongst many politicized Pakistani Shi'as remains widespread. Many Pakistani Shi'a websites and books are filled with writings advocating the Khomeini regime.

Pakistani support for Iran during the Iran–Iraq War

Iran's new revolution in 1979 took the world by surprise, and the Ayatollah's threats to export  "Red Shi'a" revolutionary influence throughout Iran's neighbouring regions eventually led Saddam Hussein's Sunni-controlled and secular Iraq, backed by the United States and the rest of the Arab world, to invade the country in 1980. The invasion signalled the start of the deadly Iran-Iraq War that would last for eight years until 1988. While Pakistan remained largely neutral, Ruhollah Khomeini's continued threats to export Iranian revolutionary sentiment fuelled tensions between Pakistan's Sunnis and Shi'as. The rising militancy among Shi'a Muslims in neighbouring countries such as Iraq and Pakistan inspired by revolutionary Iran had left many Sunni Muslims in Pakistan feeling deeply threatened. Pakistani President Zia-ul-Haq, despite his pro-Saudi, pro-Sunni and anti-Shi'a sentiments, had to manage his country's security carefully, knowing that Pakistan (due to its alliance with the United States) risked being dragged into a war with its western neighbour, one that it could most likely not afford due to its preoccupations with India in the east. In support of the Gulf Cooperation Council that was formed in 1981, around 40,000 personnel of the Pakistan Armed Forces were stationed in Saudi Arabia to reinforce the internal and external security of the region. The killing of Shi'a pilgrims in the 1987 Mecca incident in Saudi Arabia had met with widespread disturbances and condemnation throughout Pakistan, but Zia-ul-Haq remained firmly neutral and strongly issued orders against engaging any involved parties to Pakistani military personnel stationed in the Gulf. Many U.S.-built Stingers as well as various Chinese weaponry and ammunition shipped to Pakistan primarily for use by the Afghan mujahideen against the Soviets were instead sold to Iran, which proved to be a defining factor for Iran in the Tanker War against Iraq. Despite immense pressure from the United States and other Arab states, Pakistan never openly supported Iraq and provided operational/financial aid to Iran albeit the deployment of troops in Saudi Arabia was for the sole purpose of defending the country from any potential attacks by the Iranians.

Soviet invasion of Afghanistan and the Afghan Civil War

In December 1979, the Soviet Union invaded Afghanistan to support the pro-Soviet, communist Afghan government against Islamist uprisings, protect its interests in Central Asia and also as a response to established or growing American influence/dominance in the Middle East – notably in Israel, Iran (until the 1979 revolution), Iraq, and many other Arab states. In 1980, Iraq's invasion of Iran with backing from both superpowers (the United States and the Soviet Union) and other major powers improved an internationally isolated Iran's dysfunctional ties with Pakistan. During the Soviet-Afghan War, Pakistan alongside other major powers such as the United States and China focused its covert support on the Sunni Pashtun groups (a majority in Afghanistan) while Iran largely supported the Shi'a Tajik groups, though they were all united as Afghan mujahideen in waging war against the Soviet invaders.

After the Soviet withdrawal from Afghanistan and subsequent victory for the Afghan mujahideen, the rivalry between Iran and Pakistan intensified as the mujahideen broke up into multiple factions, no longer needing a union against foreign invaders. After 1989, Iran and Pakistan's policies in Afghanistan became ever more divergent as Pakistan, under Benazir Bhutto, explicitly supported Taliban forces in Afghanistan during the civil wars that erupted after the Soviet-Afghan War ended. This resulted in a major breach, with Iran becoming closer to Pakistan's rival, India. Pakistan's unwavering and continuous support for the Sunni Taliban organization in Afghanistan after the Soviet withdrawal became a problem for Shi'a Iran which opposed a Taliban-controlled Afghanistan. The Pakistani-backed Taliban fought the Iranian-backed Northern Alliance in Afghanistan and gained control of 90 percent of the country, including the capital city of Kabul. The Taliban established the Islamic Emirate of Afghanistan and began imposing ultraconservative and radical Wahhabi rule. As noted by a Pakistani foreign service officer, it was difficult to maintain good relations with Israel, Saudi Arabia, the United States, and Iran at the same time, given each state's back-and-forth rivalry with another, and in particular, Iran's rivalry with all three. In 1995 Bhutto paid a lengthy state visit to Iran, which greatly relaxed relations. At a public meeting, she spoke highly of Iran and Iranian society. However, increasing activity by Shi'a militants in Pakistan strained relations further. This was followed by the Taliban's capture of the city of Mazar-i-Sharif in 1998, in which thousands of Shi'a Muslims were massacred, according to Amnesty International.  The most serious breach in relations came in 1998, after Iran accused the Taliban government's forces of taking 11 Iranian diplomats, 35 Iranian truck drivers and an Iranian journalist hostage, and later executing all of them. Iran massed over 300,000 troops on the Afghan–Iranian border and threatened to invade Afghanistan to depose the Taliban, a government which it had never recognized. This strained Iran's relations with Pakistan, which continued to support the Taliban government. In May 1998, Pakistan conducted its first-ever nuclear weapons tests (codenamed Chagai-I), detonating five nuclear weapons at a controlled facility in its Balochistan province in response to Indian tests (codenamed Pokhran-II) a few days earlier, both events would later lead to U.N. sanctions on both Pakistan and India but did not stop either country from continuing to conduct more tests. Pakistan had now become the seventh country in the world to acquire nuclear weapons (after the United States, Soviet Union, United Kingdom, France, China and India). Pakistani Prime Minister Nawaz Sharif acknowledged Pakistan's nuclear capability and tests on 7 September 1997. Iran congratulated Pakistan for its nuclear testing.

Bilateral and multilateral visits in the late 1990s

In 1995, Pakistani Prime Minister Benazir Bhutto paid a state visit to Iran to lay the groundwork for a memorandum on energy, and begin work on an energy security agreement between the two countries. This was followed by Prime Minister Nawaz Sharif's visit to Tehran for the 8th OIC Summit Conference on 9–11 December 1997. While there, Sharif held talks with Iranian President Mohammad Khatami, with a view to improving bilateral relations, as well as finding a solution to the crisis in Afghanistan.

Chief Executive of Pakistan under a military dictatorship, General Pervez Musharraf paid a two-day visit to Tehran on 8–9 December 1999. This was his first visit to Iran (and third international trip) since his military coup d'état of 12 October 1999 and subsequent seizure of power in Pakistan. In Iran, Musharraf held talks with Iranian President Mohammad Khatami and with the Iranian Supreme Leader Ali Khamenei. This visit was arranged to allow Musharraf to explain the reasons for his takeover in Pakistan.

The meetings included discussions on the situation in Afghanistan, which were intended to lead both countries to "coordinate the policies of our two countries for encouraging the peace process through reconciliation and dialogue among the Afghan parties".

In 1998, Iran accused Pakistan of committing war crimes in Bamyan, Afghanistan, claiming that Pakistani warplanes had bombarded Afghanistan's last Shi'a stronghold in support of the Taliban government.

Relations since 2000

Since 2000, relations between Iran and Pakistan have steered towards normalization, and economic cooperation has strengthened. The September 11 attacks on the United States changed the foreign policy priorities of both countries. The George W. Bush administration's tough stance against terrorism following the attacks forced the then-Pakistani President, General Pervez Musharraf to support Washington's War on Terror campaign against the Taliban in neighbouring Afghanistan. The subsequent U.S.-led coalition invasion would end the Taliban-controlled Islamic Emirate of Afghanistan regime. Though Iranian officials initially welcomed the invasion and deposition of the Taliban, they soon found themselves encircled by U.S. forces in Pakistan, Afghanistan, Central Asia, and the Persian Gulf.

George W. Bush's inclusion of the Islamic Republic of Iran as part of an "axis of evil" (alongside Iraq and North Korea) also led some Iranian officials to presume that Tehran might be next in line for regime change, ending whatever détente had occurred in Iran–U.S. ties under Mohammad Khatami. Bush's emphasis on transformative diplomacy and democratization accompanied by an aggressive American military campaign worried Iranian leaders further.

Bilateral visits after 2000
In April 2001, the Secretary of the Supreme National Security Council Hassan Rowhani paid a state visit to Pakistan and met with Pervez Musharraf and his cabinet. During this visit, Iran and Pakistan agreed to put their differences aside and agree on a broad-based government for Afghanistan.

Iranian Foreign Minister Kamal Kharazi paid a two-day visit to Islamabad from 29 to 30 November 2001. Kharazi met with Pakistani Foreign Minister Abdul Sattar and President Musharraf. Iran and Pakistan vowed to improve their relations, and agreed to help establish a broad-based, multi-ethnic government under U.N. auspices.

The President of Iran, Mohammad Khatami, paid a three-day state visit to Pakistan from 23 to 25 December 2002, the first visit by an Iranian head of government since 1992. It was a high-level delegation, consisting of the Iranian cabinet, members of the Iranian parliament, Iranian Vice-President and President Khatami. This visit was meant to provide a new beginning to Iran–Pakistan relations. It would also allow for high-level discussions on the future of the Iran–Pakistan–India pipeline (IPI) project. Khatami met, and had detailed discussions, with both President Musharraf and the new Prime Minister Zafarullah Khan Jamali. Several accords were signed between Iran and Pakistan in this visit. Khatami also delivered a talk on "Dialogue Among Civilizations," at The Institute of Strategic Studies. The presidential delegation initially visited Islamabad, and then followed that up with a visit to Lahore, where Khatami also paid his respects at the tomb of Allama Sir Muhammad Iqbal. A Joint communique was issued by Iran and Pakistan on the conclusion of Khatami's visit. On his return to Tehran, Khatami evaluated the trip as "positive and fruitful".

As in return, Jamali paid a state visit in 2003 where he held talks with economic cooperation, security of the region, and better bilateral ties between Pakistan and Iran.  During this visit, Jamali gave valuable advises to Iranian leadership on their nuclear programme "against the backdrop of the country's" negotiations with the International Atomic Energy Agency (IAEA), and measures to strengthen economic relations between the two countries.

Military and security
Iranian support for Pakistan dates back to the 1960s when Iran supplied Pakistan with American military weaponry and spare parts after America cut off their military aid to Pakistan. After the 1971 Indo-Pakistani War, the new Prime Minister Zulfikar Ali Bhutto immediately withdrew Pakistan from CENTO and SEATO after Bhutto thought that the military alliances failed to protect or appropriately assist Pakistan and instead alienated the Soviet Union. A serious military cooperation took place during the Balochistan insurgency phases against the armed separatist movement in 1974–77.  Around ~100,000 Pakistan and Iranian troops were involved in quelling the separatist organizations in Balochistan and successfully put the resistance down in 1978–80. In May 2014, the two countries agreed to joint operations against terrorists and drug traffickers in the border regions.

In 2019, following a suicide bombing in Khash–Zahedan which killed 27 Islamic Revolutionary Guard Corps and wounded 13 others, Iranian officials criticized Pakistan. Iranian Major General Mohammad Ali Jafari asked Pakistan to conduct a crackdown against armed group Jaish al-Adl before Tehran takes it revenge. In February 2019, Bahram Ghasemi, speaking for the Foreign Ministry of Iran, said it would not tolerate what it saw as Pakistan's "inability to stop cross-border attacks in Iran". Pakistan, in turn, offered Iran cooperation in investigating the bombing and expressed sympathy for the victims of the attack. A Pakistani delegation was due to travel to Iran. On 12 May 2020 following a terrorist attack on the Pakistan-Iran border which killed six Pakistan I soldiers and injured 1, COAS General Qamar Javed Bajwa and Chief of General Staff of the Armed Forces of the Islamic Republic of Iran Mohammad Bagheri had a telephonic conversation in which both commanders discussed ways to deal with the current ongoing COVID-19 pandemic and border security and then agreed to enhance border security.

The Iranian air force has ordered approximately 25 MFI-17 Mushshaks from Pakistan.

In September 2021, the Pakistani military said one of its soldiers was killed and another soldier was injured in an attack that "targeted a Frontier Corps border post from Iranian territory". No group claimed responsibility and Iranian authorities did not comment.

Iran's view on Kashmir issue
On 19 November 2010, Iranian Supreme Leader Ayatollah Ali Khamenei appealed to Muslims worldwide to back the freedom struggle in Muslim-majority Jammu and Kashmir, equating the dispute with the ongoing conflicts of the Greater Middle East region.

"Today the major duty of the elite of the Islamic Ummah is to provide help to the Palestinian nation and the besieged people of Gaza, to sympathize and provide assistance to the nations of Afghanistan, Pakistan, Iraq and Kashmir, to engage in struggle and resistance against the aggressions of the United States, the Zionist Regime..." He further said that Muslims should be united and "spread awakening and a sense of responsibility and commitment among Muslim youth throughout Islamic communities".

The thrust of his speech was directed at Israel, India, and the U.S., but also made a veiled reference to Pakistan's nuclear program:

"The US and the West are no longer the unquestionable decision-makers of the Middle East that they were two decades ago. Contrary to the situation 20 years ago, nuclear know-how and other complex technologies are no longer considered inaccessible daydreams for Muslim nations of the region."

He said the US was bogged down in Afghanistan and "is hated more than ever before in disaster-stricken Pakistan".

A former president of Iran (1981–89), Khamenei succeeded Ayatollah Khomeini as the spiritual head of the Iranian people. A staunch supporter of Iranian President Mahmoud Ahmadinejad, Khamenei is believed to be highly influential in Iran's foreign policy.

Khamenei visited Jammu and Kashmir in the early 1980s and delivered a sermon at Srinagar's Jama Masjid mosque.

In 2017, Iran's leader Ayatollah Khamenei said that Kashmiris are being oppressed. He also urged Muslim world to "openly support people of Kashmir and repudiate oppressors and tyrants who attacked people in Ramadan".

By 2019, after India had removed the autonomy of Indian Kashmir, Pakistan's Prime Minister Imran Khan thanked Iran's Supreme Leader, for his support of Pakistan's position on the Kashmir issue.

Atoms for Peace cooperation

Since 1987, Pakistan has steadily blocked any Iranian acquisition of nuclear weapons; however, Pakistan has wholeheartedly supported Iran's viewpoint on the issue of its nuclear energy program, maintaining that "Iran has the right to develop its nuclear program within the ambit of NPT." In 1987 Pakistan and Iran signed an agreement on civil nuclear energy cooperation, with Zia-Ul-Haq personally visiting Iran as part of its "Atoms for Peace" program.

Internationally, Zia calculated that this cooperation with Iran was purely a "civil matter", necessary for maintaining good relations with Tehran. According to IAEA, Iran wanted to purchase fuel-cycle technology from Pakistan, but was rebuffed. Zia did not approve any further nuclear deals, but one of Pakistan's senior scientists did secretly hand over a sensitive report on centrifuges in 1987–89.

In 2005, IAEA evidence showed that Pakistani cooperation with Iran's nuclear program was limited to "non-military spheres", and was peaceful in nature. Tehran had offered as much as $5 billion for nuclear weapons technology in 1990, but had been firmly rejected. Centrifuge technology was transferred in 1989; since then, there have been no further atoms for peace agreements.

In 2005, IAEA evidence revealed that the centrifuge designs transferred in 1989 were based on early commercial power plant technology, and were riddled with technical errors; the designs were not evidence of an active nuclear weapons program.

Non-belligerent policy and official viewpoint
Difficulties have included disputes over trade and political position. While Pakistan's foreign policy maintains balanced relations with Saudi Arabia, the United States, and the European Union, Iran tends to warn against it, and raised concerns about Pakistan's absolute backing of the Taliban during the fourth phase of civil war in Afghanistan in the last years of the 20th century. Through a progressive reconciliation and chaotic diplomacy, both countries come closer to each other in the last few years. In the changing security environment, Pakistan and Iran boosted their ties by maintaining the warmth in the relationship without taking into account the pressures from international actors.

On Iran's nuclear program and its own relations with Iran, Pakistan adopted a policy of neutrality and played a subsequent non-belligerent role in easing the tension in the region. Since 2006, Pakistan has been strategically advising Iran on multiple occasions to counter the international pressure on its nuclear program to subsequently work on civil nuclear power, instead of an active nuclear weapons program. On international front, Pakistan has been a great advocate for Iranian usage of nuclear energy for economics and civil infrastructure while it steadily stop any Iranian acquisition of nuclear weapons, fearing another nuclear-armed race with Saudi Arabia.

In a speech at Harvard University in 2010, Pakistan's foreign minister Shah Mehmood Qureshi justified Iran's nuclear program as peaceful and argued that Iran had "no justification" to pursue nuclear weapons, citing the lack of any immediate threat to Iran, and urged Iran to "embrace overtures" from the United States. Qureshi also observed that Iran had signed the Nuclear Non-Proliferation Treaty and should respect the treaty.

Iran and Pakistan have been described as competitors for influence in the Middle East by some geo-political analysts, who argue a nuclear-armed Iran could further agitate Pakistan.

Both countries also have a history of mutual distrust, accusing each other of supporting religious and ethnic rebels within each other's borders.

Flood relief
During the 2019 Iran floods, Pakistan's National Disaster Management Authority, on the order of the country's Prime Minister Imran Khan sent 32 tonnes of relief goods to Iran. The consignment comprising two shipments contained 500 tents, 3,300 blankets and emergency medical kits. The relief goods were transferred using two C-130 aircraft. Previously Pakistan's Foreign Office (FO) spokesperson, Dr. Muhammad Faisal, condoled with the families of the victims. The spokesperson further claimed that Pakistan is ready to provide humanitarian assistance to Iran in the rescue effort. He claimed that people of Pakistan stand in solidarity with Iranian people in their difficult time.

Economic Perspective

Relations between Iran and Pakistan improved after the removal of the Taliban in 2002, but tensions remain. Pakistan has been under a strong influence of Saudi Arabia in its competition with Shiite majority Iran for influence across the broader Islamic world, which it already has in its allied nations Lebanon and Syria. Iran considers northern and western Afghanistan as its sphere of influence since its population is Persian Dari speaking. Pakistan considers southern and eastern Afghanistan as its sphere of influence since it is Pashto and Baloch speaking such as the Khyber Pakhtunkhwa and Balochistan, respectively.

Free Trade Agreement
In 2005, Iran and Pakistan had conducted US$500 million of trade. The land border at Taftan is the conduit for trade in electricity and oil. Iran is extending its railway network towards Taftan.

The Iran-Pakistan-India pipeline (IPI Pipeline) is currently under discussion; though India backed out from the project. The Indian government was under pressure by the United States against the IPI pipeline project, and appears to have heeded American policy after India and the United States proceeded to sign the nuclear deal. In addition, the international sanctions on Iran due to its controversial nuclear program could also become a factor in derailing IPI pipeline project altogether.

Trade between the two countries has increased by £1.4 billion in 2009. In 2007–08, annual Pakistan merchandise trade with Iran consisted of $256 million in imports and $218.6 million in export, according to WTO.

Bilateral trade
On 12 January 2001, Pakistan and Iran formed a "Pakistan-Iran Joint Business Council" (PIJB) body on trade disputes. The body works on to encourage the privatization in Pakistan and economic liberalization on both sides of the countries. In 2012, the bilateral trade exceeded $3 billion. Official figures from the State Bank of Pakistan for the fiscal year 2011–12 indicate imports of $124 million and exports of $131 million, which had collapsed to $36 million of exports to Iran and less than $1 million of imports for the year to April 2015. In 2011, the trade between Iran and Pakistan stood at less than $1 billion and the common geographical borders, as well as religious affinities, are among other factors, which give impetus to an enhanced level of trade. According to the media reports, Iran is the second-largest market of Basmati rice of Pakistan, ranking after Iraq.

Belt and Road Initiative 
Both Iran and Pakistan maintain strategic partnerships with China, a 25-year strategic deal between China and Iran is considered beneficial to Pakistan and Chinese government welcomes Iran’s active participation in the China–Pakistan Economic Corridor.

Techno-Entrepreneurship
Momentum of improvement of economic and political relationships between Iran and Pakistan has created a wave of bilateral agreements between Iranian and Pakistan authorities. Techno-entrepreneurship is the highly trending topic of discussion in the global development and in ECO region (Pakistan-Iran-Turkey), a lot of joint projects have been executed since 2016. ScienceTech+ Center was the first joint techno-entrepreneurship center, which was established by the Pakistani and Iranian entrepreneurs in a joint agreement between CODE Entrepreneurship Consultants Ltd (Pakistan) and Ideparvaran MashreghQazal Ltd (Iran). Several events under this platform are being organized by the [Pakistani in Iran] and Iranian authorities under the title of KarafarinShow in Iran, Pakistan and Turkey.

Impacts of US sanctions on Iran

The U.S. economic sanctions on Iran regarding their nuclear program generally affected Pakistan's industrial sector.  The fruit industry of Pakistan has reportedly lost a lucrative market in Iran, where at least 30,000 tons of mango were exported previously, as a result of the trade embargo imposed by the United States on Tehran. According to the statistics by Pakistan, the fruit industry and the exporters could not export around $10 million worth of mango during the current season. The Ministry of Commerce (MoCom) has been in direct contact with the US Department of Agriculture to resolve the issue through diplomatic channels.

Border crossings
On 16 March, 2020, Pakistan closed its border with Afghanistan and Iran due to the escalating COVID-19 pandemic in South Asia and Western Asia. In combination with the ongoing U.S. sanctions against Iran, the trade between the two countries especially for agricultural products was negatively affected.  By July 2020 however, the borders were re-opened for a limited amount of traffic to ensure the most necessary exchange of goods. On 19 December 2020, after a visit of Mohammad Javad Zarif in Pakistan, the Rimdan-Gabd border gateway was created to further bolster business and trade between the two neighboring countries. Observers believe that Tehran tries to capitalise on the increased tensions between Islamabad and Riyadh to foster better relations with Pakistan.

Turkey marked the launch of the Islamabad-Tehran-Istanbul Road Transport Corridor Project on Friday, with a welcoming ceremony in Istanbul for a convoy of Pakistani commercial trucks.

The first two National Logistics Company (NLC) trucks carrying goods from Pakistan reached Turkey via Iran, under the Transports Internationaux Routiers (TIR) convention.

The trucks departed the Pakistani port city of Karachi on September 27 and reached Istanbul on October 7, completing their 5,300 kilometers (3,293 miles) trip.

Energy

Iran–Pakistan gas pipeline

Discussions between the governments of Iran and Pakistan started in 1994 for the gas pipelines and energy security. A preliminary agreement was signed in 1995 by Prime Minister Benazir Bhutto and Iranian President Akbar Hashemi Rafsanjani, in which, this agreement foresaw construction of a pipeline from South–North Pars gas field to Karachi in Pakistan. Later, Iran made a proposal to extend the pipeline from Pakistan into India. In February 1999, a preliminary agreement between Iran and India was signed.

Iran has the world's second-largest gas reserves, after Russia, but has been trying to develop its oil and gas resources for years, due to sanctions by the West. However, the project could not take off due to different political reasons, including the new gas discoveries in Miano, Sawan and Zamzama gas fields of Pakistan. The Indian concerns on pipeline security and Iranian indecisiveness on different issues, especially prices. The Iran-Pakistan-India (denoted as IPI Pipeline) project was planned in 1995 and after almost 15 years India finally decided to quit the project in 2008 despite severe energy crises in that country.

In February 2007, India and Pakistan agreed to pay Iran US$4.93 per million BTUs (US$4.67/GJ) but some details relating to price adjustment remained open to further negotiation. Since 2008, Pakistan began facing severe criticism from the United States over any kind of energy deal with Iran. Despite delaying for years the negotiations over the IPI gas pipeline project, Pakistan and Iran have finally signed the initial agreement in Tehran in 2009. The project, termed as the peace pipeline by officials from both countries, was signed by President Zardari and President Mahmoud Ahmadinejad of Iran. In 2009, India withdrew from the project over pricing and security issues, and after signing another civilian nuclear deal with the United States in 2008. However, in March 2010 India called on Pakistan and Iran for trilateral talks to be held in May 2010 in Tehran.

According to the initial design of the project, the 2,700 km long pipeline was to cover around 1,100 km in Iran, 1,000 km in Pakistan and around 600 km in India, and the size of the pipeline was estimated to be 56 inches in diameter. However, as India withdrew from the project the size of the pipeline was reduced to 42 inch. In April 2008, Iran expressed interest in the People's Republic of China's participation in the project.

Since as early as in 2005, China and Pakistan are already working on a proposal for laying a trans-Himalayan pipeline to carry Middle Eastern crude oil to western China. Beijing has been pursuing Tehran and Islamabad for its participation in the pipeline project and willing to sign a bilateral agreement with Iran. China and Pakistan are already working on a proposal for laying a trans-Himalayan pipeline to carry Middle Eastern crude oil to western China. In August 2010, Iran invited Bangladesh to join the project.

Power Transmissions
Tehran has provided €50 million for laying of 170Km transmission lines for the import of 1000MW of electricity from Iran in 2009. Pakistan is already importing 34MW of electricity daily from Iran. The imported electricity is much cheaper than the electricity produced by the Independent Power Producers (IPPs) because Iran subsidises oil and gas which feed the power plants. Iran has also offered to construct a motorway between Iran and Pakistan connecting the two countries.

Diplomacy and role in mediation
Since Iran has no diplomatic relations with the United States; the Iranian interests section in the United States is represented by the Embassy of Pakistan Embassy in Washington. Iranian nuclear scientist, Shahram Amiri, thought to have been abducted by CIA from Saudi Arabia, took sanctuary in the Pakistan Embassy in Washington, D.C. The Iranian government claimed the United States has trumped-up charges they were involved with the 9/11 attacks.

Diplomatic missions

Iranian missions in Pakistan
Iran's chief diplomatic mission to Pakistan is the Iranian Embassy in Islamabad. The embassy is further supported by many Consulates located throughout in Pakistan.  The Iranian government supports Consulates in several major Pakistan's cities including: Karachi‡, Lahore‡, Quetta‡, Peshawar‡. Iranian government maintains a cultural consulate-general,  Persian Research Center, and Sada-o-Sima center, all in Islamabad. Other political offices includes cultural centers in Lahore†, Karachi†, Rawalpindi†, Peshawar†, Quetta†, Hyderabad†, and Multan†.
 ‡ denotes mission is Consulate General
 † denotes mission is Khana-e-Farhang (lit. culture center)

There is also an Iran Air corporate office located in Karachi Metropolitan Corporation site.

Immigration

In the Balochistan region of southeastern Iran and western Pakistan, the Balochi people routinely travel the area with little regard for the official border, causing considerable problems for the Iranian Guards Corps and the Frontier Corps of Pakistan. Both countries have ongoing conflicts with Balochi separatist groups.

Since 2010, there has been an increase in meetings between senior figures of both governments as they attempt to find a regional solution to the Afghan war and continue discussions on a proposed Iran–Pakistan gas pipeline and an Economic Cooperation Organization.

Iranian media delegations have been visiting Pakistan annually since 2004, with many journalists settling in Pakistan. These visits have played an effective role in promoting mutual understanding and projecting a positive image of Pakistan in Iran.

Notable Pakistani political figures Benazir, Murtaza, and Shahnawaz Bhutto were half Iranian Kurds on their mother's side. Nahid Mirza, the First Lady of Pakistan, was an Iranian.

Pakistani missions in Iran
Pakistan's chief diplomatic mission to Iran is the Pakistani embassy in Tehran. It is further supported by two consulates-general located throughout Iran. The Pakistani government supports its consulates in Mashhad and Zahidan.

Education

The Pakistan International School and College – Tehran aims to serve and accommodate additional educational needs for Pakistani families living in Tehran.

See also

 Iran-Pakistan border
 List of ambassadors of Iran to Pakistan
 India-Iran relations
 Iran-Saudi Arabia proxy conflict
 Nuclear program of Iran
 Pakistan Armed Forces— Iranian Contingent
 Persian language in South Asia

References

Further reading

 Asia Times on Iran-Pakistan relations
 Schoresch Davoodi & Adama Sow: The Political Crisis of Pakistan in 2007 – EPU Research Papers: Issue 08/07, Stadtschlaining 2007 – Research Paper which also describes the relations between Pakistan and Iran
 Why Pakistan is coming down hard on Iran, TRT World
 Pakistan, Iran to boost cooperation in power sector, Dawn News
  Pattanayak, Dr Satyanarayan: Iran's Relations with Pakistan: A Strategic Analysis – USI Research Book, May 2012 – A well-researched book focuses on various facets of the Iran Pakistan relationship in a long-term perspective by analyzing them under various Phases.

 

 
1947 in international relations
Bilateral relations of Pakistan
Pakistan